Benne Hole Falls is a waterfall and a tourist destination located at a distance of  from Sirsi in Karnataka, India.

Benne Hole Falls
Benne Hole Falls is made by the tributary of the Aghanashini River, which flows through the Devimane Ghat region of the Western Ghats. In Benne hole the word ‘benne’ means butter and ‘hole’ means big stream, which indicates the soft stream of this waterfalls, it is located near Sirsi, One has to first reach a village called Kasage from Sirsi and from there the falls are about 5 kms away, the first 3 kms can be covered by jeep and next 2 kms by walk.

References

Waterfalls of Karnataka
Tourist attractions in Uttara Kannada district
Geography of Uttara Kannada district